was a Japanese long-distance runner. His name was also rendered Zensaku Mogi. He competed in the 10,000 metres and the marathon at the 1920 Summer Olympics.

References

External links
 

1893 births
1974 deaths
Athletes (track and field) at the 1920 Summer Olympics
Japanese male long-distance runners
Japanese male marathon runners
Olympic athletes of Japan